Waga (Polish for "Scales") is a Polish coat of arms. It was used by several szlachta (noble) families under the Polish–Lithuanian Commonwealth.

History

Blazon

Notable bearers
Notable bearers of this coat of arms have included:

See also
 Polish heraldry
 Heraldry
 Coat of arms

Bibliography
 Herbarz Polski Kaspra Niesieckiego S.J., tom IX, str. 210

Waga